"There is a pain — so utter —" is a poem written by American poet Emily Dickinson. It was not published during her lifetime. Like many of Dickinson's poems, it was substantially changed when it was first published in 1929. The original version, with Dickinson's typical dashes, was restored by scholar Thomas H. Johnson for his 1955 edition of The Poems of Emily Dickinson.

Text
There is a pain — so utter —
It swallows substance up —
Then covers the Abyss with Trance —
So Memory can step
Around — across — opon  it —
As One within a Swoon —
Goes safely — where an open eye —
Would drop Him — Bone by Bone —

Interpretation
Pain is a recurring theme in Dickinson's poetry. This poem possibly describes an altered state of mind ("trance", "swoon") which makes the pain bearable. In this state of mind the memory is allowed to be selective, to "step around the abyss".

References

External links

 More information about "There is a pain - so utter", Emily Dickinson, Modern American Poetry.
 Emily Dickinson's use of the dash, Emily Dickinson, Modern American Poetry.

American poems
Poetry by Emily Dickinson
Poems published posthumously